The following lists events that happened during 2010 in Uruguay.

Incumbents 
 President: Tabaré Vázquez (until March 1), José Mujica (starting March 1)
 Vice President: Rodolfo Nin Novoa (until March 1), Danilo Astori (starting March 1)

Events

February 

 February 19 – the court case Philip Morris v. Uruguay begins.

May
 May 9 – 2010 Uruguayan municipal elections

References 

 
2010s in Uruguay
Uruguay
Uruguay
Years of the 21st century in Uruguay